D3 motorway may refer to:

 D3 motorway (Czech Republic)
 D3 motorway (Slovakia)